Kathyrn is a hamlet in southern Alberta under the jurisdiction of Rocky View County.

Kathyrn is located approximately 32 km (20 mi) northeast of Downtown Calgary on Highway 566, 1.6 km (1.0 mi) west of Highway 9. A Canadian National Railway line runs northeast through Kathyrn towards Three Hills.

Neil McKay, a local farmer and large landowner, named this hamlet after his daughter. He had offered some of his land to the Grand Trunk Pacific Railway Company in 1911 for a townsite, on the provision that he be permitted to give it a name. When the station was finally built in 1913, the painter who was in charge of the sign misspelled Kathryn and the settlement became known as Kathyrn. The post office opened January 1, 1919.

Demographics 

The population of Kathyrn according to the 2018 municipal census conducted by Rocky View County is 13, a decrease from its 2013 municipal census population count of 20.

See also 
List of communities in Alberta
List of hamlets in Alberta

References 

 Karamitsanis, Aphrodite (1992). Place Names of Alberta – Volume II, Southern Alberta, University of Calgary Press, Calgary, Alberta.
 Read, Tracey (1983). Acres and Empires – A History of the Municipal District of Rocky View, Calgary, Alberta.

Calgary Region
Designated places in Alberta
Hamlets in Alberta
Rocky View County